Bolkiah is a genus of arachnids in the family Haplozetidae. There is at least one described species in Bolkiah, B. hauseri.

References

Further reading

 
 

Sarcoptiformes